The Bell is a 1982 British television drama series which originally aired on BBC 2. It is an adaptation of the 1958 novel of the same title by Iris Murdoch.

Cast
 Rowena Cooper as  Mrs. Mark
 Kenneth Cranham as  Nick Fawley
 Edward Hardwicke as  Peter Topglass
 Patricia Heneghan as Sister Ursula
 Ian Holm as  Michael Meade
 Michael Maloney as  Toby Gashe
 Derrick O'Connor as  Noel Spens
 Tessa Peake-Jones as  Dora Greenfield
 Bryan Pringle as  Patchway
 William Simons as  Mark Strafford
 Trudie Styler as  Catherine Fawley
 Gareth Thomas as James Tayper Pace
 James Warwick as  Paul Greenfield
 John Woodvine as  James Tayper
 Tim Wylton as  Fr. Bob Joyce
 Rachel Kempson as Abbess
 Kenny Baker as  Jazz group member
 Patricia Donovan as  Mother Clare
 Rex Holdsworth as Station porter
 Finnuala O'Shannon as 1st Nun
 Richard Pearson as Bishop

References

Bibliography
Baskin, Ellen. Serials on British Television, 1950-1994. Scolar Press, 1996.

External links
 

BBC television dramas
1982 British television series debuts
1982 British television series endings
1980s British drama television series
1980s British television miniseries
English-language television shows
Television shows based on British novels